Marquis Mu may refer to:

Marquis Mu of Jin (died 785 BC)
Marquis Mu of Cai (died 646 BC)

See also
Duke Mu (disambiguation)